George Savoidakis (1938 – October 6, 1995) was a politician in Montreal, Quebec, Canada. He served on the Montreal city council from 1978 to 1986, representing the Parc-Extension ward as a member of mayor Jean Drapeau's Civic Party of Montreal.

Early life and career
Savoidakis was born on the Greek island of Crete and spent his formative years in the community of Agioi Deka. He moved to Canada in 1955, studied business at Concordia University, and later became a broker with Whalen Beliveau and Associates. He also served as vice-president of the Caisse Populaire de St. Roch and the Hellenic Community of the Island of Montreal.

Savoidakis ran as a Union Nationale candidate in the 1976 provincial election.

Councillor
Savoidakis was elected to the Montreal city council in the 1978 municipal election, as the Civic Party won almost all seats on council. He was re-elected in 1982. Throughout his time on council, he was a backbench supporter of Drapeau's administration. He also served on the Montreal Urban Community and was a member of its committee on minorities.

The Civic Party in this period was strongly centered around Drapeau's personality, and Savoidakis was known as one of the few party mavericks on council. In October 1985, he was quoted as saying, "Being a councillor in the Civic Party is a lonely place to be. Decisions are reached beyond our power. There are some of us, like myself, who feel we should have more input." Savoidakis tried, without success, to convince Drapeau's administration to hold night court sessions for the convenience of working Montrealers.

Savoidakis also sought to increase representation from Montreal's cultural communities on the city's police force, despite reluctance from within his own party. In 1985, he proposed that a local complaints committee be established at every police station in the Montreal Urban Community to ensure a more transparent complaints review process.

He welcomed a Quebec Superior Court ruling in 1985 that determined the province's Charter of the French Language could not prevent businesses from using English on signs and advertisements.

Rumours circulated in the mid-1980s that the Civic Party could drop Savoidakis as a candidate. Savoidakis said that he was not concerned with this threat; describing himself as a "small-c conservative," he also said that he would not defect to the progressive Montreal Citizens' Movement (MCM), which was then in opposition.

When Jean Drapeau announced that he would seek not re-election in 1986, Savoidakis supported Yvon Lamarre's unsuccessful bid to become the party's new mayoral candidate.

The Gazette supported Savoidakis's bid for re-election in 1986, even though it gave a general endorsement to the MCM. He was defeated by MCM candidate Pierre Goyer amid a landslide MCM victory across the city.

On one occasion, the Montreal Gazette described Savoidakis as "one of the few high-profile politicians in the city who is respected by almost everyone, no matter what their political orientation."

Later political career
Savoidakis was chosen as one of the Civic Party's vice-presidents in August 1988. He resigned from the party executive in March 1989, however, saying that, he was "tired of the perpetual infighting" that was affecting the party. He later joined the Montreal Municipal Party and ran for council under its banner in the 1990 election. In the 1994 election, he ran for the Montrealers Party. He was defeated both times.

He died of prostate cancer in 1995.

Electoral record

References

1938 births
1995 deaths
Greek emigrants to Canada
Montreal city councillors
People from Heraklion (regional unit)
Concordia University alumni
Deaths from cancer in Quebec